Służewiec is a neighbourhood, and an area of the Municipal Information System, in the city of Warsaw, Poland, located within the district of Mokotów.

Economy 
Służewiec is the headquarters of many companies and public bodies, such as Saatchi & Saatchi, Starcom, Filmweb, IQVIA, LuxMed, Abbott Laboratories, Polska Grupa Prasowa, Ringier Axel Springer, Plus, National Fund for Environmental Protection and Water Management, National Appeals Chamber, Panasonic, Institute of National Remembrance, Groupe Renault, AstraZeneca, DNB ASA, T-Mobile Polska, Mondelez, Toyota Bank Polska, embassy of Cuba, and many others.

History 
The oldest known mention of Służewiec in documentation comes from 1378. In said documents, it was listed as one of 17 villages of the landed property of Służewo. It was a village attached to nearby village of Służewo (currently known as Służew), and was listed to have an area of 9 voloks (equivalent to 1.616 km² or 0.624 square miles), making it the biggest on the list. In 1411, the village was given the Kulm law privileges by duke Janusz I of Warsaw, ruler of the Duchy of Warsaw. By 1580, it had the status of zaścianek, a village inhabitated by the petty nobility of the Kingdom of Poland, and was administratively part of the Warsaw Land, within the Masovian Voivodeship. In 1678 Służewiec and Służewo were bought by Stanisław Herakliusz Lubomirski becoming part of his landed property.

In 1886, the Fort VIIA "Służewiec" had been build in the village, as part of the series of fortifications of the Warsaw Fortress, build around Warsaw by the Russian Empire. The objective of the fort had been the protection of road leading to town of Puławy, now being the Puławska Streen. In 1909, it was decided to decommission and demolish the fortifications of the Warsaw Fortress, due to the high costs of their maintenance, and as such the Fort VIIA had been partially demolished in 1913. The building is currently located within the modern borders of Służew, within a neighbourhood of Służew Fort. 

From 1867 to 1938, Służewiec was part of the municipality (gmina) of Wilanów. Since 20 October 1933, functioned as one of its 18 gromadas (village assemblies). 

In 1925, the Society of Horse Breeding Promotion in Poland (Polish: Towarzystwo Zachęty do Hodowli Koni w Polsce) had bought an area of 1.5 km² (0.58 square miles), on which they begun the construction of the Służewiec Horse Race Track, which was opened in 1939.

On 27 September 1938, Służew and Służewiec were incorporated into the city of Warsaw. The area had been destroyed in 1944 by the Nazi Germany, during the Second World War, as part of the destruction of Warsaw. The only surviving historical structure is a small Roman Catholic shrine located at the Bokserska Street.

In 1951, the area of Służewiec and Zbarż, had been designated as the industrial area of the Industrial–Storage District of Służewiec (Polish: Dzielnica Przemysłowo-Składowa „Służewiec”), later known as Służewiec Przemysłowy (Industrial Służewiec). It was planned to construct 60 factories and industrial plants in the area, as well as residential buildings for 26 thousand people. The buildings were constructed in the large panel system technique, marking it as one of the first instances of such system being used in Poland. The designated area covered around 2.6 km² (1 sq mi). The construction begun in 1952. In the early 1970s, in the industrail area worked around 20 000 people. The corporations in the area were: the Tewa Semiconductors Factory (Polish: Fabryka Półprzewodników „Tewa”, Lifting Devices Factories (Polish: Zakłady Urządzeń Dźwigowych), Elwa Radio Components Factory (Polish: Fabryka Podzespołów Radiowych „Elwa”), Radio Cenamics Plants (Polish: Zakłady Ceramiki Radiowej), and Służewiec Meat-Packing Factories (Polish: Zakłady Mięsne „Służewiec”.

In the 1990s, the industrial activity in the area of Służewiec Przemysłowy and nearby western part of Ksawerów, went to a hold. As such, it had caused the appearance on the Real estate market of huge and developed estates, located near the city centre and the Warsaw Chopin Airport. It had then contributed to the development of business industry in the area, and eventually leading to the creation of the biggest complex of office buildings in Poland One of the first of new infestations in the area was the construction of Curtis Plaza office building in 1992, located at 18 Wołoska Street. From 1995 to 2001, in the area had been build the complex of office buildings known as Mokotów Business Park, located in the area of Domaniewska and Postępu Streets. In 2000, in the area had been opened Westfield Mokotów (originally known as Galeria Mokotów), one of the biggest shopping centres in the city. By 2019, in the area had been build 83 office buildings. They were mostly build without city oversight, and contributed to the development of the office monoculture. In 2019, the area begun losing its status of office centre, to the district of Wola.

Infrastructure 

 Tram Operation Plant R-3 Mokotów
 R-1 Bus Depot
 Warszawa Służewiec railway station
 Fort VIIA of the Warsaw Fortress
 Faculty of Applied Linguistics, University of Warsaw
 Faculty of Management, University of Warsaw (Szturmowa 1/3)
 Parish church of Saint Maximilian Kolbe

Mordor in Warsaw 

Varsovian Mordor is defined by the Domaniewska, Wołoska, Cybernetyki and Marynarska streets. 

One of the first new investments implemented in Mordor has been Curtis Plaza at Wołoska 18 (1991–1992). In the years 1995-2001, in the area of Domaniewska and Postępu streets, the Mokotów Business Park was built. In 2000 at Wołoska Street, Galeria Mokotów was commissioned.

By 2019, 83 office buildings had been erected in the area. Their construction was de facto outside the control of the capital's local government and contributed to the creation of an office monoculture. The name Mordor was popularized by the Facebook fanpage "Mordor na Domaniewskiej" (Mordor on Domaniewska), which in 2018 had over 100,000 followers.

In 2022, two crossing roads in Mordor were given names referring to the mythology of the Middle-earth:

 road running from Suwak Street to the east, is named after J.R.R. Tolkien
 road running from Konstruktorska Street to the north is named after Gandalf
The newspaper „Głos Mordoru” (Voice of Mordor) is published, addressed to employees of corporations based in Mordor.

Gallery

Citations

Notes

References

External links
 

Neighbourhoods of Mokotów